Can Hayri Özkan (born 2 December 1999) is a German professional footballer who plays as a right-back for Borussia Dortmund II.

References

External links
 

1999 births
Living people
German people of Turkish descent
Sportspeople from Bielefeld
German footballers
Footballers from North Rhine-Westphalia
Association football midfielders
2. Bundesliga players
Regionalliga players
Arminia Bielefeld players
Alemannia Aachen players
Næstved Boldklub players
Fortuna Düsseldorf II players
Borussia Dortmund II players
German expatriate footballers
German expatriate sportspeople in Denmark
Expatriate men's footballers in Denmark